Halton Holegate is a small village in the East Lindsey district of Lincolnshire, England.

The village Anglican church is Grade II* listed and dedicated to St Andrew. Originating from the 14th century with later additions, it is chiefly Perpendicular in style, except for the tower and the east end which were rebuilt in 1866 by James Fowler.

The village also has a public house.

Governance
An electoral ward in the same name exists. This ward stretches south west to East Kirkby with a total population taken at the 2011 census of 2,495.

References

External links

Halton Holegate St Andrews Church website 
Historic Halton Holegate Village book This Book, created in 1905 by Rev C. P. Disbrowe whilst Rector at Halton Holegate from 1900 – 1915, has been reproduced in both a digitised and reprinted format as can be seen at the link, was made as part of a project at St Andrews Church, Halton Holegate, supported by The National Lottery Heritage Fund. 

Villages in Lincolnshire
Civil parishes in Lincolnshire
East Lindsey District